UFO Romantics is the eighth full-length album by Japanese rock band Guitar Wolf. It was released in Japan on 6 March 2002 and in the United States on 24 August 2003.

Track listing
 Fire Ball Red (3:00)
 After School Thunder (2:27)
 Zaaa Zaaa Asphalt (3:32)
 Taxi Driver (2:15)
 Diamond Honey (2:17)
 Gion Midnite (4:00)
 Sparkle Baby (3:48)
 UFO Romantics (4:35)
 Nagasaki Jet (3:28)
 Jett Beer (2:55)
 Orange Juice (2:24)
 Alcohol Ace (1:49)
 Lightning's Melody (3:44)

Personnel
 Seiji (Guitar Wolf) – guitar, vocals
 Billy (Bass Wolf) – bass
 Tōru (Drum Wolf) – drums

2002 albums
Guitar Wolf albums